Salinimonas lutimaris is a Gram-negative, non-endospore-forming and non-motile bacterium from the genus of Salinimonas which has been isolated from tidal flat sediments from the coast of Korea.

References

External links
Type strain of Salinimonas lutimaris at BacDive -  the Bacterial Diversity Metadatabase

Bacteria described in 2012
Alteromonadales